Práxedis G. Guerrero was a  Mexican Revolutionary leader who was killed in action in Janos, Chihuahua, on 29 December 1910.

Named for him:
Práxedis G. Guerrero, Chihuahua
Práxedis G. Guerrero (municipality)